KAJE (107.3 FM, "107.3 The Bull") is a commercial radio station licensed to Ingleside, Texas. The station serves the Corpus Christi metropolitan area with a country music radio format. The station is currently owned by John Bushman through licensee ICA Radio, Ltd.  The station carries the syndicated "Big D and Bubba" morning show based in Nashville.

KAJE's studios and offices are located on North Upper Broadway in Corpus Christi. The transmitter is off Avenue B in Ingleside. The station broadcasts with 14,000 watts effective radiated power from a tower 446 feet in height above average terrain.

History
In 1996, the station first signed on as KAHX. It was owned by BK Radio, Inc. and aired an oldies format. At first, it broadcast with only 3,000 watts. Two years later, the station was acquired by Pacific Broadcasting of Missouri. It changed its call sign to KCCG but kept its oldies sound.

In 2004, the station was bought by Convergent Broadcasting of Corpus Christi. It got a power boost to its current 14,000 watts, as well as new call letters and a new format, KRPX, Alternative Rock. The following year, the call sign and format were changed again, this time to classic hits KJKE.

In 2009, the station switched to an adult contemporary music format, with a change in its call sign to KRSR, known as "Star 107.3."

On August 30, 2010, KRSR dropped its "Star 107.3" AC format and began stunting with an all-Beatles format, with an announcement made at 9 a.m. on Friday, September 3. Following the announcement, it became an adult hits format. The switch left rhythmic-leaning KKBA as the only AC station in Corpus Christi.

On September 7, 2010, KRSR changed call letters to KAJE, to go with the "Jake FM" branding. However, when rival station 92.7 KKBA flipped to adult hits in June 2011, KAJE moved back to a classic hits format, with only songs from the late 1960s, 70s and 80s played.

On March 24, 2017 at Midnight, after playing "Na Na Hey Hey Kiss Him Goodbye" by Steam, KAJE flipped to classic country as "My Country 107.3". The station launched with a commercial free loop of songs by George Strait (starting with "Amarillo by Morning"), which ran until Monday, March 28. Effective March 30, 2017, Convergent Broadcasting sold KAJE and sister stations KKPN and KPUS to John Busman's ICA Radio, Ltd. for $2.48 million.

In March 2020, KAJE shifted their format from classic country to country, branded as “107.3 The Bull”.

References

External links

San Patricio County, Texas
Country radio stations in the United States
AJE
Radio stations established in 1996
1996 establishments in Texas